Mongolia competed at the 2014 Winter Olympics in Sochi, Russia from 7 to 23 February 2014. Mongolia's team consisted of two cross-country skiers. This marked the third straight Winter Olympics the nation had sent two cross-country skiers. The Mongolian team was the first officially welcomed team at the Games.

Cross-country skiing 

According to the final quota allocation released on January 20, 2014, Mongolia has two athletes in qualification position. Byambadorj finished his race in 80th out of 92 competitors, while Otgontsetseg finished in 70th out of 76 competitors.

Distance

See also
Mongolia at the 2014 Summer Youth Olympics
Mongolia at the 2014 Winter Paralympics

References

External links 
Mongolia at the 2014 Winter Olympics

Nations at the 2014 Winter Olympics
2014
2014 in Mongolian sport